Maybe is the third studio album by New Zealand singer and songwriter Sharon O'Neill. Maybe peaked at No. 7 in New Zealand in November 1981.

Track listing

Charts

References

1981 albums
CBS Records albums
Sharon O'Neill albums